Michael Rusnak, C.Ss.R., (21 August 1921 – 16 January 2003) was an American-born member of the Congregation of the Most Holy Redeemer, commonly known as the Redemptorist Fathers, who was appointed Eparch of the Slovak Catholic Eparchy of Saints Cyril and Methodius of Toronto by Pope John Paul II in 1980.

Life
Born in 1921 in Beaverdale, Pennsylvania, Rusnak entered the Redemptorists in 1941 and professed religious vows as a member of the Congregation on August 2, 1942. He was ordained a priest on July 4, 1949 by Pavel Peter Gojdič, O.S.B.M., who was later declared a martyr and beatified by the Catholic Church. On August 25, 1964, he was made was Auxiliary Bishop of the Ukrainian Catholic Eparchy of Toronto and titular bishop of Tzernicus.

Rusnak took part in the third and fourth sessions of the Second Vatican Council. Pope John Paul II appointed him Eparch of the Slovak Catholic Eparchy of Saints Cyril and Methodius of Toronto on October 13, 1980. On November 11, 1996 the same pope accepted his resignation.

Rusnak died on 16 January 2003.

References

1921 births
2003 deaths
People from Cambria County, Pennsylvania
Redemptorist bishops
Eastern Catholic titular bishops
20th-century Eastern Catholic bishops
Canadian Eastern Catholic bishops
American Eastern Catholic bishops
Canadian people of Slovak descent
American people of Slovak descent
Slovak Greek Catholic bishops
20th-century Roman Catholic bishops in Canada
20th-century American clergy